Carlos Pacheco (26 October 1925 – 13 April 2000) was a Costa Rican sports shooter. He competed in two events at the 1968 Summer Olympics.

References

1925 births
2000 deaths
Costa Rican male sport shooters
Olympic shooters of Costa Rica
Shooters at the 1968 Summer Olympics
People from Puntarenas